The 1978 Stanford Cardinals football team represented Stanford University in the Pacific-10 Conference during the 1978 NCAA Division I-A football season. Led by second-year head coach Bill Walsh, the Cardinals were 7–4 in the regular season (4–3 in Pac-10, tied for fourth) and played their home games on campus at Stanford Stadium in Stanford, California. Their four losses were by a combined total of sixteen points.

In the Astro-Bluebonnet Bowl on New Year's Eve, Stanford rallied from a 22-point deficit in the second half to defeat #11 Georgia 25–22. and finished with an 8–4 record and a top twenty ranking.

Less than two weeks later, Walsh departed for the NFL's San Francisco 49ers, and receivers coach Rod Dowhower was promoted. Walsh won three Super Bowls in ten seasons with the Niners, took three years off, and returned to Stanford as head coach in 1992.

Season

Schedule

Personnel

Awards and honors
Steve Dils, Sammy Baugh Trophy

All-conference

Two sophomores were named to the All-Pac-10 team, halfback Darrin Nelson and wide receiver Ken Margerum, along with senior linebacker Gordy Ceresino.

NFL Draft
Two Cardinals were selected in the 1979 NFL Draft.

References

External links
 Game program: Stanford at Washington State – October 21, 1978

Stanford
Stanford Cardinal football seasons
Bluebonnet Bowl champion seasons
Stanford Cardinals football